Ben Brown is a British playwright. He was educated at Highgate School. When interviewed about The Promise, his 2010 play about the Balfour Declaration, he said that he had grown up in North London with  a non-observant Jewish father.

Works
Larkin With Women, (2000) a portrait of Philip Larkin and his love-lives which won the TMA Best New Play award that year
 All Things Considered, (1996) a black comedy about philosophy and suicide
The Promise (2010), about the Balfour Declaration
 Three Days in May, (2011) a drama concentrating on Winston Churchill's darkest hours in the early parts of the Second World War
A Splinter of Ice, (2020) a drama that reconstructs the meeting between spy Kim Philby and author Graham Greene in Moscow in 1987

Sources

British dramatists and playwrights
Living people
People educated at Highgate School
British male dramatists and playwrights
Year of birth missing (living people)